Myrmica bibikoffi is a species of ant that can be found in Germany, Switzerland, Spain, France, and The Netherlands.

References

Myrmica
Insects described in 1963
Hymenoptera of Europe